Aracati - Dragão do Mar Regional Airport  is the airport serving Aracati and the beach resort Canoa Quebrada, Brazil.

It is administrated by Socicam.

History
The airport was commissioned on August 10, 2012.

Airlines and destinations

Access

See also

List of airports in Brazil

References

External links

Airports in Ceará
Airports established in 2012